Kunnenkeril Kuruvila Jacob (1904-1991) was an Indian educationist from the South Indian state of Kerala. Born on 3 August 1904 in a small hamlet of Aymanam in Kottayam district and educated at various places such as Kottayam, Thiruvananthapuram, Nagercoil, and Parur, Jacob did higher education at Leeds University. He started his career as the first Indian headmaster of Madras Christian College School, Chennai, in 1931 and retired from there in 1962. After retirement, he was in charge of Hyderabad Public School for seven years and, later, worked as the principal of Cathedral and John Connon School, Mumbai. He died on 25 August 1991. He was honored by the Government of India, in 1991, with the fourth highest Indian civilian award of Padma Shri. Jacob's students have started an initiative for bringing about innovation in teaching methodology under the name, Kuruvila Jacob Initiative.

See also

 M. C. C. Higher Secondary School
 Hyderabad Public School
 The Cathedral & John Connon School

References

Recipients of the Padma Shri in literature & education
Malayali people
People from Kottayam district
1904 births
1991 deaths
20th-century Indian educational theorists
Educators from Kerala